The fourth season of Bates Motel aired from March 7-May 16, 2016. The season consisted of 10 episodes and aired on Mondays at 9 p.m. ET/PT on A&E. The series itself is described as a "contemporary prequel" to the 1960 film Psycho, following the life of Norman Bates and his mother Norma prior to the events portrayed in the Hitchcock film. The series takes place in the fictional town of White Pine Bay, Oregon.

The season received critical acclaim from television critics, and was nominated for two Primetime Creative Arts Emmy Awards. It also won three People's Choice Awards for Cable TV Drama, Cable TV Actress (Farmiga), and Cable TV Actor (Highmore). Bates Motel fourth season maintained consistent ratings throughout its airing, with the season premiere drawing in 1.55 million viewers and the finale totalling 1.50 million. The season was released on Blu-ray and DVD on October 18, 2016.

Cast and characters

Main

 Vera Farmiga as Norma Louise Bates
 Freddie Highmore as Norman Bates
 Max Thieriot as Dylan Massett
 Olivia Cooke as Emma Decody
 Nestor Carbonell as Sheriff Alex Romero

Recurring
 Damon Gupton as Dr. Gregg Edwards
 Jaime Ray Newman as Rebecca Hamilton
 Andrew Howard as Will Decody
 Terence Kelly as Dickie Bolton
 Ryan Hurst as Chick Hogan
 Marshall Allman as Julian Howe
 Kelly-Ruth Mercier as Nurse Penny
 Aliyah O'Brien as Regina
 Karina Logue as Audrey Ellis
 Fiona Vroom as Vicki Monroe
 Craig Erickson as Howard Collins
 Anika Noni Rose as Liz Babbitt
 Louis Ferreira as Doctor Guynan
 David Cubitt as Sam Bates
 Luke Roessler as Young Norman

Guest
 Kevin Rahm as Bob Paris
 Keenan Tracey as Gunner
 Alexia Fast as Athena
 Alessandro Juliani as Interviewer
 Lindsey Ginter as Mac Dixon
 Kenny Johnson as Caleb Calhoun
 Gina Chiarelli as O'Sullivan
 Carmen Moore as Grace Wei
 Jay Brazeau as Justin Willcock
 Molly Price as Detective Chambers

Production

Casting
Ryan Hurst returned to the series as Chick Hogan, a recurring character throughout the third season. Damon Gupton was cast in the recurring role of Gregg Edwards, a doctor at Pineview Mental Institution. Jaime Ray Newman played a major recurring role throughout the season as Rebecca Hamilton, a former girlfriend of Romero.

Filming
The series was filmed on location in Aldergrove, British Columbia. At the beginning of the first season, a replica of the original Bates Motel set from the film Psycho was built on 272nd Street. Nestor Carbonell directed one episode of the fourth season. Principal photography for season 4 began on November 30, 2015 in Vancouver and surrounding areas, and concluded on April 6, 2016. Highmore written the eighth episode of the season.

Episodes

Reception

Critical response
The fourth season of Bates Motel has been met with critical acclaim. The season holds a 100% positive rating on review aggregator website Rotten Tomatoes, based on 17 responses from television critics.

Ratings
Overall, the fourth season of Bates Motel averaged 1.45 million viewers, with a 0.6 rating in the 18–49 demographic.
 A  Cable Live +3 data is used here as Live +7 was not made available.

Awards and nominations

In its fourth season, Bates Motel was nominated for 17 awards, winning three.

References

External links
 
 

2016 American television seasons
Season 4